Steven Thomas Pheasant (born 25 June 1951) is an English former cricketer. Pheasant was a right-handed batsman who bowled right-arm medium pace. He was born in Southwark, London.

Pheasant made a single first-class appearance for Sussex against Cambridge University in 1971. He was dismissed for a duck in Sussex's first-innings by Phil Edmonds, while in Cambridge University's first-innings he bowled 23 wicketless overs, though he only conceded 33 runs. In Sussex's second-innings, he ended not out on 2, while in Cambridge University's second-innings he took figures of 4/88 from 27 overs. Despite this, the match ended in a draw. Along with fellow debutant Mark Upton, this was his only major appearance for Sussex.

He played a total of 17 Second XI Championship matches for Sussex between 1968 and 1971.

References

External links
Steven Pheasant at ESPNcricinfo
Steven Pheasant at CricketArchive

1951 births
Living people
People from Southwark
English cricketers
Sussex cricketers